Conservative liberalism or right-liberalism is a variant of liberalism, combining liberal values and policies with conservative stances, or simply representing the right-wing of the liberal movement. In the case of modern "conservative liberalism", scholars sometimes see it as a more positive and less radical variant of classical liberalism, but it is also referred to as an individual tradition that distinguishes it from classical liberalism and social liberalism. Conservative liberal parties tend to combine economically liberal policies with more traditional stances and personal beliefs on social and ethical issues.

In general, liberal conservatism and conservative liberalism have different philosophical roots. Historically, "liberal conservatism" refers mainly to the case where conservatives embrace the elements of classical liberalism, and "conservative liberalism" refers to classical liberals who support a laissez-faire economy as well as socially conservative principles (for instance, Christian family values). Since classical liberal institutions were gradually accepted by conservatives, there is very little to distinguish liberal conservatives from conservative liberals.

Neoconservatism has also been identified as an ideological relative or twin to conservative liberalism, and some similarities exist also between conservative liberalism and national liberalism.

Overview 

Conservative liberalism emerged in late 18th century France and United Kingdom, when the moderate bourgeoisie supported the monarchy within the liberal camp. Representatively, Doctrinaires, which existed during the Bourbon Restoration was a representative conservative-liberal party. Radicalism emerged as an opposition against the moderateness of these (conservative) liberals. Whiggism (Whig liberalism) in the United Kingdom also forms early conservative liberalism and is distinguished from British Radicalism (radical liberalism).

According to Robert Kraynak, a professor at Colgate University, rather than "following progressive liberalism (i.e. social liberalism), conservative liberals draw upon pre-modern sources, such as classical philosophy (with its ideas of virtue, the common good, and natural rights), Christianity (with its ideas of natural law, the social nature of man, and original sin), and ancient institutions (such as common law, corporate bodies, and social hierarchies). This gives their liberalism a conservative foundation. It means following Plato, Aristotle, Socrates, St. Augustine, St. Thomas Aquinas, and Edmund Burke rather than Locke or Kant; it usually includes a deep sympathy for the politics of the Greek polis, the Roman Republic, and Christian monarchies. But, as realists, conservative liberals acknowledge that classical and medieval politics cannot be restored in the modern world. And, as moralists, they see that the modern experiment in liberty and self-government has the positive effect of enhancing human dignity as well as providing an opening (even in the midst of mass culture) for transcendent longings for eternity. At its practical best, conservative liberalism promotes ordered liberty under God and establishes constitutional safeguards against tyranny. It shows that a regime of liberty based on traditional morality and classical-Christian culture is an achievement we can be proud of, rather than merely defensive about, as trustees of Western civilization".

In the European context, conservative liberalism should not be confused with liberal conservatism which is a variant of conservatism combining conservative views with liberal policies in regards to the economy, social and ethical issues. The roots of conservative liberalism are to be found at the beginning of the history of liberalism. Until the two world wars, the political class in most European countries from Germany to Italy was formed by conservative liberals. The events such as World War I occurring after 1917 brought the more radical version of classical liberalism to a more conservative (i.e. more moderate) type of liberalism. Conservative liberal parties have tended to develop in those European countries where there was no strong secular conservative party and where the separation of church and state was less of an issue. In those countries, where the conservative parties were Christian democratic, this conservative brand of liberalism developed.

Political stance 

Conservative liberalism is generally a liberal ideology that contrasts with social liberalism.

Conservative liberalism, along with social liberalism and classical liberalism, is mentioned as the main liberal ideology of European politics. It is often used to describe liberalism close to the centre to centre-right of the political spectrum. However, there are sometimes conservative liberals who are located on the right-wing political position.

Social, classical and conservative liberalism 
"Social liberalism" is a combination of economic Keynesianism and cultural liberalism. "Classical liberalism" is economic liberalism that partially embraces cultural liberalism.

"Conservative liberalism" is an ideology that highlights the conservative aspect of liberalism, so it can appear in a somewhat different form depending on the local reality.

Conservative liberalism refers to ideologies that show relatively conservative tendencies within the liberal camp, so it has some relative meaning. In the United States, conservative liberals mean de facto classical liberals, but in Europe, "Christian democrats" and "Ordoliberals" can also be included. (Christian democracy is a mainstream European conservative ideology, so there are cases where it supports free markets.)

By country

France 
Alexis de Tocqueville and Adolphe Thiers were representative French conservative liberals. They were classified as centre-left liberals (progressive-Orléanists) during the July monarchy alone, but after the 1848 Revolution, the Second Republic entered and they were relegated to conservative liberals.

Germany 
Prior to World War II, conservative liberalism or "right-liberalism" was often used in a similar sense to "national-liberalism". National Liberal Party during the German Empire and German People's Party during the Weimar Republic are representative. (Currently, "right-liberalism" and "national liberalism" are used in similar meanings in Germany.) According to the German Wikipedia, most of the national liberals during the Weimar Republic joined the CDU, a liberal-conservative party. For this reason, the terms "conservative liberalism" are not often used in Germany.

Ordoliberalism is more a variant of conservative liberalism than classical liberalism (which is economic liberalism that embraces cultural liberalism) or social liberalism, in principle because it is influenced by the notion of social justice based on traditional Catholic teachings. After the war, Germany pursued economic growth based on the social market economy, which is deeply related to ordoliberalism.

United Kingdom 
In the United Kingdom, David Hume, Adam Smith and Edmund Burke have been identified as conservative liberals.

United States 
In the United States, liberal usually refers to a social liberal form, so those referred to as conservative liberals in Europe are often simply referred to as conservatives in the United States. Milton Friedman and Irving Kristol are mentioned as representative conservative liberal scholars.

Harry S. Truman is considered a conservative-liberal or national-liberal (although he supported Keynesian economic policies). The former president Franklin D. Roosevelt supported the socially liberal agenda and was and conciliatory to the Soviet Union, but Truman supported a more moderate social policy and was a strong anti-communist.

Political scientists evaluate all politicians in the United States as liberals in the academic sense. In general, rather than the Democratic Party, which is close to social-liberal, the Republican Party is evaluated as a conservative-liberal party. In the case of the Democratic Party, Blue Dog Democrats is evaluated as close to conservative-liberal in fiscal policy. However, the current Blue Dog is cultural moderate to liberal. (Unlike classical liberals, conservative liberals in Europe, including KESK, sometimes criticize cultural liberalism.)

American neoconservatives might be classified as conservative liberals, according to Peter Lawler, a professor at Berry College, who argued: [I]n America today, responsible liberals—who are usually called neoconservatives—see that liberalism depends on human beings who are somewhat child-centered, patriotic, and religious. These responsible liberals praise these non-individualistic human propensities in an effort to shore up liberalism. One of their slogans is 'conservative sociology with liberal politics.' The neoconservatives recognize that the politics of free and rational individuals depends upon a pre-political social world that is far from free and rational as a whole. In the American context, conservative liberalism as well as liberal conservatism should not be confused with libertarian conservatism, influenced by right-libertarianism.

Notable thinkers 

 David Hume (1711–1776)
 Adam Smith (1723–1790)
 Edmund Burke (1729–1797)
 Marquis de Lafayette (1757–1834)
 Adolphe Thiers (1797–1877)
 Alexis de Tocqueville (1805–1859)
 William Ewart Gladstone (1809–1898)
 Camillo Benso (1810–1861)
 Stanley Baldwin (1867–1947)
 Winston Churchill (1874–1965)
 Gustav Stresemann (1878–1929)
 Joseph Schumpeter (1883–1950)
 Harry S. Truman (1884–1972)
 Walter Eucken (1891–1950)
 Robert Menzies (1894–1978)
 Ludwig Erhard (1897–1977)
 Wilhelm Ropke (1899–1966)
 Friedrich Hayek (1899–1992)
 Michael Oakeshott (1901–1990)
 Ayn Rand (1905–1982)
 Raymond Aron (1905–1983)
 Milton Friedman (1912–2006)
 Erik von Kuehnelt-Leddihn (1919–1999)
 Irving Kristol (1920–2009)
 Francis Fukuyama (born 1952)
 Malcolm Turnbull (born 1954)
 Donald Tusk (born 1957)

Parties and organisations

Conservative liberal parties or factions 

 Argentina: Union of the Democratic Centre, Christian Democratic Party
 Australia: Liberal Party of Australia
 Belgium:  Open Flemish Liberals and Democrats, Reformist Movement, New Flemish Alliance, Libertarian, Direct, Democratic, People's Party
 Brazil: Progressive Party, Social Democratic Party, Liberal Party
 Bulgaria: National Movement for Stability and Progress
 Canada: British Columbia Liberal Party, Coalition Avenir Québec, Saskatchewan Party
 Croatia: Croatian Social Liberal Party
 Czech Republic: Mayors and Independents, TOP 09, Civic Democratic Party, ANO 2011
 Denmark: Venstre–Liberal Party of Denmark
 Estonia: Estonian Reform Party
 El Salvador: Nuevas Ideas, GANA
 Faroe Islands: Union Party, People's Party
 Finland: National Coalition Party, Centre Party
 France: The Republicans, Horizons 
 Germany: Free Democratic Party
 Ghana: New Patriotic Party
 Greece: New Democracy
 Greenland: Feeling of Community
 Iceland: Independence Party
 Ireland: Fianna Fáil, Fine Gael
 Israel: Likud, Telem, New Hope
 Italy: Forza Italia
 Japan: Liberal Democratic Party (factions), Democratic Party for the People
 Latvia: Unity
 Lithuania: Liberal Movement, Freedom and Justice
 Luxembourg: Democratic Party
 Moldova: Liberal Party, Liberal Reformist Party
 Netherlands: People's Party for Freedom and Democracy, JA21
 New Zealand: New Zealand National Party
 Norway: Progress Party
 Philippines: Liberal Party (factions), Laban ng Demokratikong Pilipino
 Poland: Civic Platform
 Portugal: Social Democratic Party
 Romania: National Liberal Party
 Russia: People's Freedom Party, Democratic Choice
 Slovakia: Freedom and Solidarity For the People
 Slovenia: Slovenian Democratic Party
 South Africa: Democratic Alliance
 South Korea: Minsaeng Party, Democratic Party of Korea (factions)
 Spain: People's Party, Catalan European Democratic Party, Basque Nationalist Party
 Switzerland: FDP.The Liberals
 Sweden: Liberals
 Thailand: Democrat Party
 Turkey: Future Party
 Ukraine: Civil Position
 United Kingdom: Conservative Party 
 United States: Republican Party

Historical parties or factions 

 Austria: Constitutional Party, Federation of Independents, Freedom Party of Austria
 Belarus: Belarusian Peasant Party
 Brazil: National Democratic Union
 Chile: National Party
 Czech Republic: Civic Democratic Alliance, Public Affairs
 El Salvador:  National Coalition Party
 France: Feuillant, Thermidorians,  Doctrinaires, Resistance Party, Union for the New Republic/Union of Democrats for the Republic/Rally for the Republic, Independent Republicans/Republican Party/Liberal Democracy, Union for French Democracy Republican Party, Union for a Popular Movement, Agir
 Germany: German People's Party
 Iceland: Liberal Party (1927), Liberal Party (1998)
 Ireland: Fianna Fail, Progressive Democrats
 Israel: General Zionists, Liberal Party
 Italy: Italian Liberal Party, Italian Liberal Right, Forza Italia, Civic Choice
 Japan: New Party Sakigake
 Latvia: Latvian Way, Latvia's First Party/Latvian Way
 Lithuania: National Resurrection Party, Liberal and Centre Union
 Mexico: Liberal Party
 Netherlands: Liberal State Party, Party of Freedom
 New Zealand: United Party
 Norway: Frisinnede Venstre
 Poland: Liberty, League of the Right of the Republic, Liberal Democratic Congress, Poland Together
 Romania: Democratic Liberal Party, Liberal Reformist Party
 Russia: Democratic Choice of Russia
 Serbia: Serbian Progressive Party
 Slovakia: Democratic Party
 South Korea: Korea Democratic Party, Democratic Nationalist Party, Democratic Party (1955), New Democratic Party, Reunification Democratic Party, Democratic Party (1990), United Democratic Party (1995), National Congress for New Politics, Democratic Party (South Korea, 2000), People Party (2016), Party for Democracy and Peace, New Alternatives
 Spain: Liberal Party, Democratic Convergence of Catalonia
 Switzerland: Free Democratic Party, Liberal Party
 Turkey: Justice and Development Party, Motherland Party
 United Kingdom: Whigs, Liberal Unionist Party, National Liberal Party
 United States: Whig Party

See also 

 Classical liberalism
 Economic liberalism
 Liberal conservatism
 Libertarian conservatism
 National liberalism
 Ordoliberalism

References

Sources 
 

 
Liberalism
Centre-right ideologies
Centrism
Conservatism in the United States
Ordoliberalism
Political culture
Political ideologies
Political science terminology
Right-wing ideologies